Mark Bourrie (born 1959 or 1960) is a Canadian journalist and author. He has worked as a contract lecturer at Carleton University and the University of Ottawa. In 2020, his biography of Pierre-Esprit Radisson, Bushrunner: The Adventures of Pierre Radisson, won the RBC Taylor Prize for literary non-fiction.

Education
Bourrie graduated with a Bachelor of Arts in History from the University of Waterloo. He also holds a diploma in public policy and administration from the University of Guelph, a master's degree in journalism from Carleton University, a doctorate in Canadian media history from the University of Ottawa, and a law degree in from the University of Ottawa. He is a member of the Ontario bar.

Bourrie's PhD thesis was on Canada's World War II press censorship system and was published by Douglas & McIntyre as "The Fog of War".

Career 

He worked for two decades as a freelance journalist and feature writer, primarily for The Globe and Mail from 1981 to 1989 and the Toronto Star from 1989 to 1999 and sporadically since then, and maintained a blog. He was Parliamentary correspondent for the Law Times from 1994 until 2006. He also wrote for the InterPress Service, the United Nations-sponsored news and feature service. By the late 1990s, he had branched out from newspaper freelance work to book and magazine writing. He won a 1999 National Magazine Award gold award for his Ottawa City Magazine article, "The System That Killed Santa" and the Ontario Community Newspaper Association's award for 2007 Columnist of the Year for his work in the Ottawa City Journal.

Bourrie became a contract lecturer in Carleton University's history department and the University of Ottawa's Canadian studies department. He was also a member of Canada's Parliamentary Press Gallery and an expert and author on propaganda and censorship.

In a 2012 article, Bourrie stated that the Chinese government-owned Xinhua News Agency asked him to collect information on the Dalai Lama by exploiting his journalistic access to the Parliament of Canada. Bourrie stated that he was asked to write for Xinhua in 2009 and sought advice from the Canadian Security Intelligence Service (CSIS), but was ignored. Bourrie stated that the request for information about the Dalai Lama caused him to refuse to continue to write articles for Xinhua.

In April 2015, during the fraud trial of Senator Mike Duffy, Bourrie testified that he received an unsolicited cheque for $500 from Duffy, after spending an estimated 80–100 hours combating internet trolls who had posted material about Duffy, including editing Duffy's Wikipedia entry. Bourrie testified that he did not recall asking for payment and that his research services would usually run $100 per hour. Christopher Waddell, a journalism professor and former Parliament Hill correspondent, said it was "inappropriate" for Bourrie, as a journalist, to accept paid work from Duffy.

In 2021, Bourrie, was the lawyer retained by Ottawa Life Magazine to defend against a defamation lawsuit filed by then Ottawa Police Service chief Peter Sloly. Sloly alleged that an article published by the magazine falsely and maliciously painted him as mismanaging misogyny problems within the force.

Personal life
Bourrie is originally from the North Simcoe area of Ontario. He is married to Marion Van de Wetering, a federal government lawyer.

Books
Bourrie is a bestselling author and has written several non-fiction books. The Globe and Mail described Bushrunner: The Adventures of Pierre Radisson, his biography of French fur trader and adventurer Pierre Radisson, as "a significant contribution to the history of 17th-century North America". The book won the RBC Taylor Prize for non-fiction in 2020, the last time the prize was awarded.

Bibliography
Chicago of the North. Annan and Sons, 1993.
Ninety Fathoms Down. Toronto: Dundurn, 1995.
The Parliament Buildings. Toronto: Dundurn, 1996.
By Reason of Insanity: The David Michael Krueger Story. Toronto: Dundurn, 1997.
Flim Flam. Toronto: Dundurn, 1998.
Parliament. Toronto: Key Porter, 1999. (preface to Malak Karsh's photo essay on Parliament Hill)
Hemp. Toronto: Key Porter, 2004.
True Canadian Stories of the Great Lakes. Toronto: Key Porter/Prospero, 2005.
Many a Midnight Ship. Ann Arbor: University of Michigan Press/Toronto: Key Porter, 2005.
The Fog of War. Vancouver, Douglas & McIntyre, 2011.
Fighting Words: Canada's Best War Reporting. Toronto: Dundurn, 2012
Kill the Messengers: Stephen Harper's Assault on Your Right to Know. Toronto: HarperCollins Canada, 2015
 The Killing Game: Martyrdom, Murder and the Lure of ISIS. Toronto: HarperCollins Canada 2016
Bushrunner: The Adventures of Pierre Radisson. Windsor: Biblioasis, 2019

See also
 List of University of Waterloo people

References

Living people
Canadian male journalists
Canadian male non-fiction writers
Canadian maritime historians
Canadian bloggers
Male bloggers
Writers from Toronto
Writers from Ottawa
Journalists from Toronto
University of Waterloo alumni
Carleton University alumni
University of Guelph alumni
University of Ottawa alumni
Academic staff of Concordia University
Year of birth missing (living people)